In-store Financial Services refer to those financial services provided at retail businesses such as check cashing, money orders, money (wire) transfers, utility and express bill payments, mobile phone top-ups, telephone calling cards and micro-loans.

The major providers of these services in the U.S. include Western Union and MoneyGram, who provide financial services within retail locations such as supermarkets and convenience stores.

Retail financial services